Archie Middleship Bastock (19 March 1869 – 13 October 1954) was a Welsh footballer. He was part of the Wales national football team, playing one match on 27 February 1892 against Ireland.

See also
 List of Wales international footballers (alphabetical)

References

1869 births
1954 deaths
Welsh footballers
Wales international footballers
Sportspeople from Hereford
Association football forwards